Maria Charles (born 22 September 1929) is an English film, television and stage actress, director and comedian. She is probably best known for her TV performance as the overbearing mother Bea Fisher in the ITV sitcom Agony. Charles has also appeared on the stage in original West End productions including musicals by Stephen Sondheim, Charles Strouse and Sandy Wilson.

Early life
Maria Charles was born in London on 22 September 1929 as Maria Zena Schneider. She was the daughter of David Schneider (1896-1980) and Celia Schneider née Ashkenaza (1906-1954). Her father was a hairdresser who used the soubriquet "Mr Charles". When she graduated from the Royal Academy of Dramatic Art in London in 1946 she took her father's working name as her stage surname.

Career
Charles has had an exceptionally long acting career that spans over seven decades. She made her stage debut as the Dormouse in a 1945 production of Alice in Wonderland at the Connaught Theatre, Worthing and her West End theatre debut in the Pick up Girl at the Prince of Wales Theatre in 1946. Charles appeared in the original London production of The Boy Friend as 'Dulcie' which ran for a total of 2,082 performances from (1954 to 1959). She played the part of 'Solange Lafitte' in the original West End production of Follies at the Shaftesbury Theatre by Stephen Sondheim. The show ran for 644 performances from 21 July 1987 to 4 February 1989 and starred Julia McKenzie, Daniel Massey and Eartha Kitt. Charles has worked extensively in theatre, TV and films and has carved a niche for herself on television playing clingy Jewish mothers. She appeared in the memorable BBC Play for Today anthology TV series which ran from (1970 to 1984) in the TV play the Bar Mitzvah Boy which won the BAFTA, British Academy Television Award for (best single play); in 1977 it was placed 56th in a BFI poll of the 100 Greatest British Television Programmes of the 20th century, voted by industry professionals. She also played Maureen Lipman's character's mother in the ITV sitcom Agony from 1979 to 1981. In 1981 she starred in Nell Dunn's new comedy play, Steaming at the Comedy Theatre Stratford East, playing alongside Brenda Blethyn; the production won the Laurence Olivier Award for Best New Comedy that year.

Other notable TV credits include well known television series such as: Z-Cars, Crossroads, Secret Army, Brideshead Revisited, Coronation Street, Whoops Apocalypse, Boon, Never the Twain, Lovejoy, Casualty, Holby City and Bad Girls.

Her notable film credits have included: Sisterhood, Hot Fuzz, Cuba, Revenge of the Pink Panther, Victor Victoria, and Sixty Six.

Stage appearances
(Stage debut) Dormouse, Alice in Wonderland, Connaught Theatre, Worthing, England, 1945
(London West End debut) Ruby Lockwood, The Pick-Up Girl, Prince of Wales Theatre, London, 1946
Rosie, Women of Twilight, Vaudeville Theatre, London, 1951
See You Again (Sandy Wilson revue), Watergate Theatre, London, 1952
Swing Back the Gate (Geoffrey Wright, revue), Irving Theatre, London, 1952.
Sorrell Connaught, A Kiss for Adele, Royal Court Theatre, London, 1952
Florrie Solomon, Spring Song, Embassy Theatre, London, 1953
Dulcie, The Boy Friend, Wyndham's Theatre, London, 1954–1958
Dulcie Du Bois, The Boy Friend, Globe Theatre, London, 1965
Fairy Sorayah, Ali Baba and the Forty Thieves, Players' Theatre, London, 1965
Florence, Enter a Free Man, St. Martin's Theatre, London, 1968
Jessie Macfarlane, Mrs. Dawkins, Bridgid O'Cooney, Mrs. van Boven, Dellarosa Paravici, Miss Minter, Mary Thornton, Mrs. Campbell-Scully, and Mrs. Zuckmeyer, They Don't Grow on Trees, Prince of Wales Theatre, 1969
Felice Kovacs, Partners, Royal Lyceum Theatre, Edinburgh, Scotland, 1969
Piglet, Winnie the Pooh, Phoenix Theatre, London, 1972
Fairy Cabbage Rose, Beauty and the Beast, Players' Theatre, 1973
Annie Chapman, Jack the Ripper, Players' Theatre, 1974
Mrs. Dolly Gallagher Levi, The Matchmaker, Her Majesty's Theatre, London, 1978
Mistress Overdone, Measure for Measure, Riverside Studios, Hammersmith, England, 1979
Miss Hannigan, Annie, Victoria Palace Theatre, London, 1979
Steaming, Theatre Royal Stratford East, London, 1981.
Yente, Fiddler on the Roof, Apollo Theatre, London, 1983
Solange Lafitte, Follies, Shaftesbury Theatre, London 1987
Multiple roles in the British National Theatre repertoire season at the Cottesloe Theatre, Lyttelton Theatre, and Olivier Theatre in London, 1989
Vera Klein, The Absence of War, Royal National Theatre, London, 1993
Melissa, Party Time & One for the Road, Battersea Arts Centre, London, 2003.
Noreen Biggs, Bad Girls, Garrick Theatre, London, 2007

Film appearances
Goldie, A Gunman Has Escaped, Monarch, 1948
WRAC female soldier, Folly to Be Wise, British Lion, 1952
Blonde, The Deadly Affair, Columbia, 1967
Tea lady, The Strange Case of the End of Civilization as We Know It, 1977
Lady Client, Revenge of the Pink Panther, 1978
Senora Pulido, Cuba, United Artists, 1979
Madame President, Victor/Victoria, MGM/UA, 1982
Mrs. Weedle, Under the Bed, CFU, 1988.
The Pure Gatherer, The Fool, 1990
Sylvia Pinker, Antonia & Jane, Miramax, 1991.
Maria, August Entertainment/Bratton/Wavepower Navigation Corp., 1995
The Broadway Babies, Hey, Mr Producer! (also known as Hey Mr. Producer! The Musical World of Cameron Mackintosh), Act Two, Broadway Baby, Follies, 1998
Mrs Glitzman, Sixty Six, 2006.
Mrs Reaper, Hot Fuzz, 2007.
Ethel, Sisterhood, 2008.

Television appearances

Series
Lorelei Macefield, Crossroads, 1964.
Mrs. Higgins, Pollyanna, BBC, 1973
Madge, Thomas and Sarah, 1979
Bea Fisher, Agony, LWT 1979
Mrs. Sadler, Never the Twain, Thames Television 1981
May, Dream Stuffing, Channel 4 1984
Bea Fisher, Agony Again, BBC, 1995.
Lena Thistlewood, Coronation Street, ITV, 2005.

Miniseries
Miss Ninetta Crummles, Nicholas Nickleby, BBC, 1957.
Maria D'Israeli, Disraeli, ATV, 1978.
Ma Mayfield, Brideshead Revisited, PBS, 1982.
Lady Chairperson, "A Perfect Spy" (also known as "John Le Carre's A Perfect Spy"), Masterpiece Theatre, PBS, 1988
Sarah Pocket, Great Expectations, ITV 1989.
Old lady gambler, The 10th Kingdom, NBC, 2000.

TV films
Florrie Small, The Likes of 'Er, BBC Films, 1947.
Blanaid, The Moon in the Yellow River, BBC Films, 1947.
Sara Pocket, Great Expectations, NBC, 1974
Widow Corney, Oliver Twist, ABC, 1997.
Alena, Crime and Punishment (also known as Dostoevsky's Crime and Punishment), NBC, 1998
Mrs. Hawtrey, Cor, Blimey!, Company 2000.

TV specials
Mrs Hartop, "The Mill", Country Matters I, 1972
Mrs. Rita Green, Bar Mitzvah Boy (also known as Play for Today:Bar Mitzvah Boy), 1977

TV episodesRogues Gallery, ITV, 1968.
Joyce Farrington, Crown Court, 1975.
Grandma Canty, The Prince and the Pauper, 1976.
 Louise Colbert, Secret Army, BBC, 1977.
Jewish woman, "The Violet Hour," Whoops Apocalypse, 1982
Mrs. Jowett, "Charity Begins at Home: Parts 1 & 2," Boon, 1988
Miss Phelan, "Deluge," Casualty, 1989Alas Smith & Jones, 1990
Alice, "The Galloping Major," Lovejoy, 1993
Second lady, "Paris, October 1916," The Young Indiana Jones Chronicles, 1993
Celia Owen, "Release," Holby City, 2001
Noreen Biggs, "Pillow Talk", "Prison Issue" & "5.12" Bad Girls, 2002 & 2003
Granny, Series Finale, Skins'', 2009.

Directing credits
The Boy Friend, (40th anniversary original cast reunion), at the Players Theatre, London, 1995.
Poppy at the ICA, London, 1999.

Other
Anna Gemignani, Anna (pilot), NBC, 1990

She has also appeared in Angel Pavement, Down Our Street, Easter Passion, The Fourth Wall, The Good Old Days, La Ronde, Rogue's Gallery, Shine on Harvey Moon, Turn Out the Lights, The Ugliest Girl in Town, The Voice of the Turtle, and Sheppey.

References

External links
 . Accessed: 21 July 2013. 
 Monarch Film Corporation (films) at IMDb. Accessed: 21 July 2013.
 Maria Charles at Hollywood.com. Accessed: 21 July 2013.
 Maria Charles at DigiGuide.tv. Accessed: 21 July 2013.
 . Accessed: 21 July 2013. 

1929 births
Living people
English film actresses
English television actresses
English musical theatre actresses
Actresses from London
British people of Jewish descent
Jewish English actresses
English women comedians